Bear Valley Springs is a guarded-gate community in Kern County, California, United States. Bear Valley Springs is in the Tehachapi Mountains and is part of the greater Tehachapi area. The population fluctuates between a low during the winter months when snow is common, to a high in the summer months when its elevation keeps it much cooler than surrounding areas and major cities. The population was 5,172 at the 2010 census, up from 4,232 at the 2000 census. For statistical purposes, the United States Census Bureau has defined Bear Valley Springs as a census-designated place (CDP). The census definition of the area may not precisely correspond to local understanding of the area with the same name.

History

While the nation had pushed to the western coast, the land the Fickert family settled in 1869 was still isolated and remote. For centuries, it had been the realm of Native Americans.

By 1959, the last of the immediate Fickert family were gone, joining their kin who had gone before in the tiny family cemetery just up the hill from the main house.

Dart Resorts purchased the ranch from the Fickert heirs. Resource Ecology Associates was employed by Dart to plan and maintain the original natural value of the property, including wildlife. Bear Valley Springs was born.

The first sales of property were in late 1970 with a full sales team starting January 1971. The project was sold out in November 1977. The Bear Valley Springs Community Services District was formed to act as a nonprofit organization for management and maintenance of the water, roads, and police protection. The Bear Valley Springs Property Owners Association was formed to administer the amenity package. Together they insure the upkeep of the facilities of Bear Valley Springs.

The original concept was a second home destination resort where families could come to spend a weekend or longer and have a complete amenities package. The concept changed from second homes to full-time residents, approximately 3,700 homes. Former President Ronald Reagan bought a ranch in BVS. A number of athletes and TV/movie stars have made BVS their home.

Geography

Climate
According to the Köppen Climate Classification system, Bear Valley Springs has a semi-arid climate, abbreviated "BSk" on climate maps with a climate similar to Tehachapi, CA.

Annual climate specifics can be found at

Demographics

2010
At the 2010 census Bear Valley Springs had a population of 5,172. The racial makeup of Bear Valley Springs was 4,776 (92.3%) White, 74 (1.4%) African American, 46 (0.9%) Native American, 57 (1.1%) Asian, 3 (0.1%) Pacific Islander, 89 (1.7%) from other races, and 127 (2.5%) from two or more races. Hispanic or Latino of any race were 399 people (7.7%).

The census reported that 5,171 people (100% of the population) lived in households, 1 (0%) lived in non-institutionalized group quarters, and no one was institutionalized.

There were 2,124 households, 571 (26.9%) had children under the age of 18 living in them, 1,467 (69.1%) were opposite-sex married couples living together, 103 (4.8%) had a female householder with no husband present, 54 (2.5%) had a male householder with no wife present.  There were 44 (2.1%) unmarried opposite-sex partnerships, and 16 (0.8%) same-sex married couples or partnerships. 429 households (20.2%) were one person and 214 (10.1%) had someone living alone who was 65 or older. The average household size was 2.43.  There were 1,624 families (76.5% of households); the average family size was 2.79.

The age distribution was 1,068 people (20.6%) under the age of 18, 246 people (4.8%) aged 18 to 24, 684 people (13.2%) aged 25 to 44, 1,941 people (37.5%) aged 45 to 64, and 1,233 people (23.8%) who were 65 or older.  The median age was 51.0 years. For every 100 females, there were 99.2 males.  For every 100 females age 18 and over, there were 94.8 males.

There were 2,729 housing units at an average density of 65.7 per square mile, of the occupied units 1,860 (87.6%) were owner-occupied and 264 (12.4%) were rented. The homeowner vacancy rate was 4.6%; the rental vacancy rate was 10.5%.  4,470 people (86.4% of the population) lived in owner-occupied housing units and 701 people (13.6%) lived in rental housing units.

2000
At the 2000 census there were 4,232 people, 1,586 households, and 1,329 families in the CDP. The racial makeup of the CDP was 89.89% White, 1.37% Black or African American, 0.31% Native American, 0.71% Asian, 0.07% Pacific Islander, 2.95% from other races, and 4.70% from two or more races.  7.84% of the population were Hispanic or Latino of any race.
Of the 1,586 households 32.2% had children under the age of 18 living with them, 76.9% were married couples living together, 4.0% had a female householder with no husband present, and 16.2% were non-families. 13.6% of households were one person and 6.6% were one person aged 65 or older.  The average household size was 2.67 and the average family size was 2.93.

The age distribution was 26.5% under the age of 18, 3.1% from 18 to 24, 22.3% from 25 to 44, 29.3% from 45 to 64, and 18.8% 65 or older.  The median age was 44 years. For every 100 females, there were 96.2 males.  For every 100 females age 18 and over, there were 94.3 males.

The median household income was $61,169 and the median family income  was $64,583. Males had a median income of $61,834 versus $31,591 for females. The per capita income for the CDP was $27,388.  About 5.4% of families and 7.2% of the population were below the poverty line, including 10.3% of those under age 18 and 7.0% of those age 65 or over.

References

External links
Bear Valley Community Services District
Bear Valley Springs Property Owners Association

Census-designated places in Kern County, California
Tehachapi Mountains
Tehachapi, California
1869 establishments in California
Populated places established in 1869
Census-designated places in California